Moosalb may refer to:
Moosalb (Schwarzbach), a river of Rhineland-Palatinate, Germany, tributary of the Schwarzbach
Moosalb (Alb), a river of Baden-Württemberg, Germany, tributary of the Alb

See also
Moosalp, a high mountain pass in the canton of Valais in Switzerland